Obdulio is a Spanish male given name. It may refer to:

Obdulio Ávila Mayo, Mexican politician
Obdulio Diano, Argentine footballer
José Obdulio Gaviria, Colombian politician
Epifanio Obdulio Guerrero, known as Epy Guerrero, Dominican baseball scout
Obdulio "Calulo" Hernández, Honduran footballer
Obdulio Morales, Cuban pianist
Juan Obdulio Sainz, Deputy National Director of the Argentine National Gendarmerie
Obdulio Trasante, Uruguayan footballer
Obdulio Varela, Uruguayan footballer
Estadio Obdulio Varela, football stadium
José Obdulio Villanueva, Guatemalan sergeant convicted due to the murder of Juan José Gerardi Conedera
Obdulio Rogelio Zarza, Argentine boxer